Nippoptilia cinctipedalis is a moth of the family Pterophoridae. It is found in Australia, Korea, Japan (Kyushu), China, Micronesia, the Republic of Palau and Vietnam.

Adults emerge in September and October in Japan.

The larvae feed on Cayratia japonica. They bite the flower-bud and flower of the host plant and usually pupate on the tendril, or rarely on the pedicel. The pupal stage lasts for 7–8 days. The eggs are laid on the flower-bud.

References

External links
Australian Faunal Directory
Taxonomic And Biological Studies Of Pterophoridae Of Japan (Lepidoptera)
Japanese Moths
Insects of Micronesia Volume 9, no. 3 Lepidoptera: Pterophoridae

Moths described in 1864
Moths of Australia
Platyptiliini
Moths of Japan
Moths of Asia
Moths of Oceania